The following is a list of the 207 municipalities (comuni) of the Province of Brescia, Lombardy, Italy.

A 
Acquafredda
Adro
Agnosine
Alfianello
Anfo
Angolo Terme
Artogne
Azzano Mella

B 
Bagnolo Mella
Bagolino
Barbariga
Barghe
Bassano Bresciano
Bedizzole
Berlingo
Berzo Demo
Berzo Inferiore
Bienno
Bione
Borgo San Giacomo
Borgosatollo
Borno
Botticino
Bovegno
Bovezzo
Brandico
Braone
Breno
Brescia
Brione

C 
Caino
Calcinato
Calvagese della Riviera
Calvisano
Capo di Ponte
Capovalle
Capriano del Colle
Capriolo
Carpenedolo
Castegnato
Castel Mella
Castelcovati
Castenedolo
Casto
Castrezzato
Cazzago San Martino
Cedegolo
Cellatica
Cerveno
Ceto
Cevo
Chiari
Cigole
Cimbergo
Cividate Camuno
Coccaglio
Collebeato
Collio
Cologne (pronunciation: ko-LOH-nyeh)
Comezzano-Cizzago
Concesio
Corte Franca
Corteno Golgi
Corzano

D 
Darfo Boario Terme
Dello
Desenzano del Garda

E 
Edolo
Erbusco
Esine

F 
Fiesse
Flero

G 
Gambara
Gardone Riviera
Gardone Val Trompia
Gargnano
Gavardo
Ghedi
Gianico
Gottolengo
Gussago

I 
Idro
Incudine
Irma
Iseo
Isorella

L 
Lavenone
Leno
Limone sul Garda
Lodrino
Lograto
Lonato
Longhena
Losine
Lozio
Lumezzane

M 
Maclodio
Magasa
Mairano
Malegno
Malonno
Manerba del Garda
Manerbio
Marcheno
Marmentino
Marone
Mazzano
Milzano
Moniga del Garda
Monno
Monte Isola
Monticelli Brusati
Montichiari
Montirone
Mura
Muscoline

N 
Nave
Niardo
Nuvolento
Nuvolera

O 
Odolo
Offlaga
Ome
Ono San Pietro
Orzinuovi
Orzivecchi
Ospitaletto
Ossimo

P 
Padenghe sul Garda
Paderno Franciacorta
Paisco Loveno
Paitone
Palazzolo sull'Oglio
Paratico
Paspardo
Passirano
Pavone del Mella
Pertica Alta
Pertica Bassa
Pezzaze
Pian Camuno
Piancogno
Pisogne
Polaveno
Polpenazze del Garda
Pompiano
Poncarale
Ponte di Legno
Pontevico
Pontoglio
Pozzolengo
Pralboino
Preseglie
Prevalle
Provaglio d'Iseo
Provaglio Val Sabbia
Puegnago sul Garda

Q 
Quinzano d'Oglio

R 
Remedello
Rezzato
Roccafranca
Rodengo-Saiano
Roè Volciano
Roncadelle
Rovato
Rudiano

S 
Sabbio Chiese
Sale Marasino
Salò
San Felice del Benaco
San Gervasio Bresciano
San Paolo
San Zeno Naviglio
Sarezzo
Saviore dell'Adamello
Sellero
Seniga
Serle
Sirmione
Soiano del Lago
Sonico
Sulzano

T 
Tavernole sul Mella
Temù
Tignale
Torbole Casaglia
Toscolano-Maderno
Travagliato
Tremosine
Trenzano
Treviso Bresciano

U 
Urago d'Oglio

V 
Vallio Terme
Valvestino
Verolanuova
Verolavecchia
Vestone
Vezza d'Oglio
Villa Carcina
Villachiara
Villanuova sul Clisi
Vione
Visano
Vobarno

Z 
Zone

See also
List of municipalities of Italy

References

 01
Brescia